Norman Davidson may refer to:

 Norman Davidson (biochemist) (1911–1972), Scottish biochemist, pioneer molecular biologist
 Norman Davidson (biologist) (1916–2002), American biologist
 Norrie Davidson (born 1934), Scottish footballer

See also
Norman Davison (1907–1990), politician
Norman Davison (footballer) (1888–1958), Australian rules footballer